Three Little Beers is a 1935 short subject directed by Del Lord starring American slapstick comedy team The Three Stooges (Moe Howard, Larry Fine and Curly Howard). It is the 11th entry in the series released by Columbia Pictures starring the comedians, who released 190 shorts for the studio between 1934 and 1959.

Plot
Gainfully employed in the delivery department of the Panther Pilsner Beer company (a reference to the derogatory slang term, characterizing poor quality beer as "panther piss"), the Stooges go through several mishaps while loading the back of their truck with a six-barrel tall stack of beer barrels. After learning of a golf tournament their company is sponsoring, in which cash prizes will be awarded, the boys  quickly drive off to the Rancho Golf Club to improve their golfing skills. To gain access, they impersonate reporters by using knobs torn from bathroom fixtures as press badges. The ruse barely succeeds—Moe's and Larry's are marked "press", but Curly's reads "pull". Once inside, the Stooges unknowingly steal some golfers' clothes, and split up to practice—although they know absolutely nothing about golf.

Curly gets his golf ball stuck in the tree and decides the only way to retrieve it is by chopping the tree down, Moe finds an open area to practice, but the only thing that he hits is the ground, which is soon pockmarked with hundreds of divots, And Larry practices putting, but a root gets in his way, and he tears up the putting green in his efforts to extract the seemingly endless root. All of this destruction is noticed by the two outraged and angry Italian groundskeepers, to one of whom Moe's explanation of the field of divots was, was that "The Pieces are getting Smaller" - this drives the groundskeepers to complain to the golf course's management personnel, who respond by sending the police in pursuit of the trio.

The Stooges manage to escape in their beer truck. As they drive up a steep hill, two barrels fall off the truck and roll away. Parking the truck, the Stooges give chase but to no avail. It gets worse when the parked truck's brake loosens and the truck rolls into a curb, knocking the rest of the barrels loose, which roll downhill as well — directly toward the Stooges, who are eventually pushed into a freshly laid sidewalk of wet cement.

Cast

Credited

Production notes
Three Little Beers was filmed on location in Los Angeles, California on October 9–12, 1935; it features more outdoor locations than any other Stooges film. The golf course featured was Rancho Golf Course, on Pico Boulevard and Patricia Avenue in Cheviot Hills, located across the street from 20th Century Fox studios. The scene featuring rolling beer barrels chasing the Stooges down a hilly street was filmed off of Echo Park Avenue in Los Angeles. This is the second of sixteen Stooge shorts with the word "three" in the title.

This short also marks the first appearances of two Stooge regulars, Eddie Laughton and John Tyrrell.

The leaflet the boys read announcing the Panther Brewing Company’s Sixth Annual Golf Tournament states the event will be held at the Public Golf Course “Sunday, Dec. 19, 1935”, however, December 19 fell on a Thursday that year.

In popular culture
Two slapstick routines from Three Little Beers were reworked in the Farrelly brothers 2012 Three Stooges film:
 Moe smacks Larry with his left hand, and Larry cries "Oh, my neck!", then Moe slaps him again with his right hand and asks "How does it feel now" and Larry replies "All right," then Moe slaps him yet again with both hands and says "That's good. C'mon on! What's the matter with you?".
 In a deleted scene on the DVD release, Curly is washing his clothes on the golf course (the original scene from 1935 featured Curly using a ball washer for laundering his clothes). Moe is about to smack Curly, but Larry butts in and asks what's going on. Moe tries to poke Larry's eyes, but Curly stops him. Moe then slaps Curly. He turns to Larry, who has his eyes covered. Moe smacks the top of Larry's head, Larry opens his hand, and Moe pokes his eyes, this continues twice. Moe sets up his fist, Curly smacks, Moe begins the around-the-world bop (or "hand-to-hand head clunk"), hitting Larry's chin in the process, then hitting Curly's head.

References

External links 
 
 
 
Three Little Beers at threestooges.net

1935 films
The Three Stooges films
American black-and-white films
1935 comedy films
Films directed by Del Lord
Columbia Pictures short films
American slapstick comedy films
Golf films
1930s English-language films
1930s American films